Spreading wattle is a common name for several plants and may refer to:

Acacia genistifolia, native to southeastern Australia
Acacia quadrimarginea